Castel San Pietro Terme is a city and comune in the Metropolitan City of Bologna, Emilia-Romagna, Italy, with about 21,000 inhabitants. It is located along the Roman Via Emilia, at the foot of the Tuscan-Emilian Apennines.

History  

In Roman times there was a statio, that is, a control post at the service of travelers who walked the via Emilia. Perhaps there was a small temple dedicated to the goddess Ops, protector of the crops. Between the fifth and sixth centuries, at the time of the reign of the Ostrogoths, a Christian basilica was built with structural characteristics similar to the Ravenna churches of the Goth era, perhaps it was dedicated to the Aryan cult.

The place was later abandoned. In the 11th century, a small church with an adjoining cemetery dedicated to San Pietro was built on the site, at the service of the settlement that had remained on the road, the Borgo. The castrum from which the city took its name was built in 1200 and it can be assumed that it took its name from this already present church. Frederick II of Swabia stayed there several times with his court between 1220 and 1222, conferring many privileges, some of which are very important, for the Florentines of San Giovanni in Fiore. The initiative came from the podestà of Bologna Orlando de 'Rossi, a city which, in the same period, had numerous fortifications built to defend its borders. The castrum of San Pietro was placed on the border with the territory of Imola, at the time a Ghibelline city, while Bologna was a Guelph city.

In the first quarter of the 15th century the town hosted the antipope Giovanni XXIII (1370-1419) and his papal court; during the late Middle Ages Castel San Pietro was chosen for two periods as the temporary seat of the University of Bologna, which remained closed, apparently, due to serious student intemperances.

In 1509 Bologna passed definitively under the Papal States, therefore Castel San Pietro lost its military function.

In 1859 it became part of the Kingdom of Sardinia, which became, two years later, the Kingdom of Italy.

On 17 April 1945 Castel San Pietro celebrated the Liberation.

Monuments and places of interest  
Among the points of interest of the town, the main religious monuments are:
 Church of Santa Maria Maggiore, built in the 15th century and almost entirely rebuilt in the 18th century. 
 Church of San Biagio in Poggio
 Church of Santi Re Magi (the Three Wise Men) in Gallo Bolognese
 Church of San Mamamte in Liano
 Church of San Michele Arcangelo di Casalecchio di Conti
 Church of Sant’Antonio della Gaiana
 Church of San Giorgio in Varignana
 Church of Santa Maria e San Lorenzo in Varignana
 Church of Madonna del Lato
 Ex Church of San Martino of Montecalderaro, destroyed during World War II.

The symbol of Castel San Pietro Terme is the Cassero, a military fortification, which represented the main access to the town in the past. Today the building has been reinvented as a theatre.

Another important edification of the town is the Column with the Madonna del Fossombrone, in the middle of the square XX Settembre, where the town hall is located. The column was built on the project of Gian Giacomo Dotti, an architect of the 18th century, and was dedicated to the Madonna del Rosario, the patron of the Castel San Pietro.

Moreover, thanks to the presence of sources of sulphurous and salsobromoiodic water, Castel San Pietro Terme has been known for being a thermal locality from the Middle Age on. The thermal system started to work in 1870.

Culture 
In Castel San Pietro Terme the Carrera Autopodistica has taken place every year since 1954.

Sport 
 S.S.D. Castel San Pietro Terme Calcio

Twin towns
 Bad Salzschlirf, Germany
 Opatija, Croatia
 Lovran, Croatia
 Matulji, Croatia
 Casoli, Italy

References

Spa towns in Italy